Heather Mazur (born June 17, 1976) is an American actress, best known for her role as Sarah Cooper in the 1990 film Night of the Living Dead.

Early life and education 
Mazur was born in Pittsburgh. She earned a Bachelor of Fine Arts from Carnegie Mellon University and a Master of Fine Arts from the Yale School of Drama.

Career 
Mazur did not act on screen for over ten years after Night of the Living Dead was released, before making a guest appearance in the television series Hack in 2003. Since then she has guest starred in Numb3rs, Joey, CSI: NY, CSI: Miami, Medium, Criminal Minds, Law & Order: LA, The Mentalist,  Bones and the J. J. Abrams-produced unsold television pilot Anatomy of Hope. She also had recurring roles in Crash (2008–2009) and Pretty Little Liars (2010–2012). She is currently portraying Deputy Mayor Eileen Ashby in the soap opera General Hospital (since 2022).

Her film credits include Over Her Dead Body (2008), the direct-to-video film The Funeral Planner (2010), and A Leading Man (2013). She has also acted on stage.

Filmography

Film

Television 
{| class="wikitable sortable"
!Year
!Title
!Role
!Notes
|-
|2003
|Hack
|Rina Lowe
|Episode: "Presumed Guilty"
|-
|2006
|Numbers
|Janet Eckworth
|Episode: "Harvest"
|-
|2006
|Related
|Sue
|Episode: "His Name Is Ruth"
|-
|2006
|Joey
|Woman
|Episode: "Joey and the Big Move"
|-
|2007
|Big Shots
|Nadia
|Episode: "Who's Your Daddy?"
|-
|2007
|Journeyman
|Bonnie
|Episode: "Winterland"
|-
|2007, 2008
|CSI: NY
|Natalie Greer
|2 episodes
|-
|2008–2009
|Crash
|Amy Battaglia
|10 episodes
|-
|2009
|Medium
|Clare Burnes
|Episode: "A Taste of Her Own Medicine"
|-
|2009
|Three Rivers
|Tracy Warren
|Episode: "The Kindness of Strangers"
|-
|2009
|Anatomy of Hope
|Harriet
|Television film
|-
|2010
|Law & Order: LA
|Dr. Phoebe Coburn
|Episode: "Playa Vista"
|-
|2010–2012
|Pretty Little Liars
|Isabel Randall
|3 episodes
|-
|2011
|CSI: Miami
|Rose Garrigan
|Episode: "Caged"
|-
|2011
|Criminal Minds
|Kate Phinney
|Episode: "The Stranger"
|-
|2011–2015
|Awkward
|Darlene Saxton
|7 episodes
|-
|2012
|The Mentalist
|Colette Santori
|Episode: "Always Bet on Red"
|-
|2012
|Bones
|Marcy Drew
|Episode: "The Tiger in the Tale"
|-
|2013
|Marvin Marvin
|Stickler
|Episode: "St. Glar Kai Day"
|-
|2014
|Switched at Birth
|Lydia Kaiser
|3 episodes
|-
|2014
|Matador
|Sayer Assistant
|Episode: "Everything Old Is New Again"
|-
|2014
|Modern Family
|Anne Gibbs
|Episode: "Queer Eyes, Full Hearts"
|-
|2015
|Glee
|Publicist
|Episode: "Loser like Me"
|-
|2015
|House of Lies
|Kathy Nichols
|Episode: "Praise Money! Hallowed Be Thy Name"
|-
|2015
|Castle
|Gwen Kelly
|Episode: "At Close Range"
|-
|2015
|NCIS
|Laura Strike-DePalma
|Episode: "Double Trouble"
|-
|2015
|Wicked City
|Penelope Evans
|Episode: "Blizzard of Ozz"
|-
|2016–2017
|Insecure
|Hannah Richards-Foster
|5 episodes
|-
|2017
|Doubt
|Stephanie Verner
|Episode: "Not a Word"
|-
|2017
|Chance
|Talia
|2 episodes
|-
|2018
|9-1-1
|Beth Clark
|Episode: "Next of Kin"
|-
|2018
|Grey's Anatomy
|Erin Mason
|Episode: "Bad Reputation"
|-
|2018–2019
|The Young and the Restless
|Brenda Brecheen
|5 episodes
|-
|2019
|Magnum P.I.
|Gina Pryor
|Episode: "A Kiss Before Dying"
|-
|2019
|Dear White People
|Caroline Tuttle
|Episode: "Volume 3: Chapter V"
|-
|2019
|Good Trouble
|Angela Miller
|11 episodes
|-
|2019
|How to Get Away with Murder
|Heidi Turpin
|Episode: "I Hate the World"
|-
|2019–2020
|Tacoma FD
|Vicky Penisi McConky
|9 episodes
|-
|2020
|NCIS: Los Angeles
|Margaux West
|Episode: "War Crimes"
|-
|2022
|The Lincoln Lawyer
|Carol Dubois
|Recurring role
|-
|2022
| General Hospital
|Eileen Ashby
|Recurring role

References

External links

1976 births
20th-century American actresses
21st-century American actresses
Actresses from Pittsburgh
American people of Polish descent
American film actresses
American stage actresses
American television actresses
Carnegie Mellon University College of Fine Arts alumni
Living people
Yale School of Drama alumni